Viktor Lvovych Polyakov (born September 29, 1981 in Perm, Russia) is a boxer from Ukraine, who competed at the 2004 Summer Olympics in Athens, Greece.

References

 sports-reference

1981 births
Living people
Super-middleweight boxers
Boxers at the 2004 Summer Olympics
Olympic boxers of Ukraine
Sportspeople from Perm, Russia
Ukrainian male boxers